Cristini may refer to:

 Michealene Cristini Risley, American award-winning writer, director and human rights activist
 Micol Cristini (born 1997), Italian figure skater
 Vittorio Cristini (1928-1974), Italian professional football player